Platycheirus amplus is a Holarctic species of hoverfly found in wetlands, fens, moorland streams and bogs.

Description
External images
For terms, see: Morphology of Diptera. 
Frons have broad and ill-defined pollinose spots, occupying more than 3/4 of frons. Marks on tergites 3 and 4 are about 1.5 times as broad as long. The 3rd tergite is distinctly less than twice as broad as long.
See references for determination.

Distribution
Palearctic: Britain, Ireland, Sweden, Denmark, the Netherlands and Belgium. Nearctic: Alaska south to California.

Biology
Habitat: fen and poor fen, flushes and brooks in moor and bog.

It flies June to July. Playcheirus larvae feed on aphids on various low-growing plants and bushes.

References

Diptera of Europe
Diptera of North America
Syrphinae
Insects described in 1927